Dande, with its capital at Barra do Dande, is a municipality in Bengo Province in Angola.

Subdivisions
Dande comprises seven communes as follows.
 Caxito
 Barra do Dande
 Mabubas
 Kikabo
 Úcua

References 

Populated places in Bengo Province
Municipalities of Angola